This is a list of cabbage dishes and foods. Cabbage (Brassica oleracea or variants) is a leafy green or purple biennial plant, grown as an annual vegetable crop for its dense-leaved heads. Smooth-leafed firm-headed green cabbages are the most common, with smooth-leafed red and crinkle-leafed savoy cabbages of both colors seen more rarely. Cabbages are prepared in many different ways for eating. They can be pickled, fermented for dishes such as sauerkraut, steamed, stewed, sautéed, braised, or eaten raw. Cabbage is a good source of vitamin K, vitamin C and dietary fiber. Contaminated cabbage has been linked to cases of food-borne illness in humans.

Cabbage dishes
 Bacon and cabbage – traditionally associated with Ireland, the dish consists of unsliced back bacon (although smoked bacon is sometimes used), and it is boiled with cabbage. (Sometimes other vegetables are added such as turnips, onions, and carrots.) It is usually served with boiled potatoes. 
 Bigos - a Polish stew
 Bubble and squeak – traditional English dish made with the shallow-fried leftover vegetables from a roast dinner. Cabbage is sometimes used.
 Cabbage roll 
 Gołąbki 
 Holishkes
 Kåldolmar
 Sarma 
 Cabbage squares
 Cabbage soup 
 Cabbage stew
 Cassoeula 
 Shchi 
 Colcannon 
 Coleslaw 
 Holishkes – also known as golub 
 Kaalilaatikko 
 Kapuska – Turkish cuisine cabbage stew 
 Kapusta – Polish cuisine sauerkraut dish
 Kimchi 
 Knieperkohl
 Lion's head – dish from the Huaiyang cuisine of eastern China, consisting of large pork meatballs stewed with vegetables. The plain variety is usually stewed or steamed with napa cabbage.
 Maple slaw
 Podvarak
 Red slaw 
 Rotkohl - a Northern Germany dish made from cooked red cabbage, vinegar, cloves, and tart apples.
 Rumbledethumps
 Surkål 
 Wedding cabbage

Cabbage-based foods
 Curtido 
 Sauerkraut
 Sour cabbage
 Suan cai – a traditional Chinese pickled Chinese cabbage, used for a variety of purposes. Suan cai is a unique form of pao cai, due to the ingredients used and the method of production.
 Tianjin preserved vegetable

See also

 List of vegetable dishes
 Lists of prepared foods

References

 
Cabbage